Daniel Abrams (born May 20, 1966) is an American media entrepreneur, television host, legal commentator, and author. He is currently the host of the prime-time show Dan Abrams Live on NewsNation, On Patrol: Live on Reelz and The Dan Abrams Show: Where Politics Meets The Law on SiriusXM's P.O.T.U.S. channel.  He is also the Chief Legal Analyst of ABC News.

Abrams was the host of Live PD on the A&E cable network and created and hosts Court Cam, a Law&Crime production on A&E.  He was formerly an anchor of Nightline. Abrams also worked as the chief legal correspondent and analyst for NBC News and general manager of MSNBC, and doubled as an anchor for the same network.  He began his professional career in 1994 as a reporter for Court TV, covering, among others, the O. J. Simpson murder trial.

Early life
Daniel Abrams was born in Manhattan; he is Jewish, the son of Efrat and well-known attorney Floyd Abrams, an expert on constitutional law. He is a 1984 graduate of Riverdale Country School. Abrams received his B.A. cum laude in political science from Duke University in 1988. While at Duke, he anchored newscasts on the student-run channel Cable 13 and was vice president of the student body. Abrams received a J.D. from Columbia Law School.

Career

Television and broadcasting

Early career
Abrams worked as a reporter for Court TV from May 1994 to June 1997, where he covered the O. J. Simpson case, the International War Crimes Tribunal from the Netherlands, and the assisted-suicide trials of Dr. Jack Kevorkian from Michigan.

MSNBC and NBC News
After leaving Court TV, Abrams was a general assignment correspondent for NBC News from 1997 to 1999 at which time he was named Chief Legal Correspondent. Abrams then began hosting his own show at MSNBC, and The Abrams Report began in 2001. Abrams hosted The Abrams Report until he accepted the lead managerial position at MSNBC. Abrams held the position of General Manager of MSNBC from June 12, 2006, until October 2007. Abrams left to concentrate on his program Live with Dan Abrams, which replaced Scarborough Country due to Joe Scarborough's move to mornings. This show would eventually be revamped and renamed Verdict with Dan Abrams, which aired until August 21, 2008. MSNBC announced on August 19, 2008, that Air America Radio host Rachel Maddow would take over that time slot beginning September 8, 2008. At that time, Abrams took on additional duties with NBC News including substituting as an anchor on the Today show.

ABC
In March 2011, Abrams left NBC to become the Chief Legal Analyst for ABC News and a substitute anchor on Good Morning America. ABC announced in June 2013 that Abrams would become the network's Chief Legal Affairs Anchor, as well as an anchor of Nightline. He stepped down from his full time role as Nightline anchor in December 2014 to focus on his expanding media businesses and returned to his freelance role as the network's Chief Legal Analyst. In 2020, The Poynter Report described Abrams as the "go-to analyst on legal affairs."

A&E
From October 2016 to June 2020, Abrams hosted the A&E show Live PD, which followed police officers live across the United States as they patrol their communities. Using dash-cam footage, handheld low-light-capable cameras, and fixed-camera rigs, Abrams analyzed each incident with analysts Tom Morris Jr. and Sean "Sticks" Larkin as the police work occurs. He was also co-host of Grace vs. Abrams, in which Abrams and legal commentator Nancy Grace debated high-profile crime cases. In 2019, Abrams signed on to produce and host Court Cam, a new show that takes viewers inside America's courtrooms. Live PD was canceled on June 10, 2020, in the wake of protests against police brutality following the murder of George Floyd and the destruction of the video footage of the killing of Javier Ambler.

NewsNation
On July 19, 2021, Nexstar announced that Abrams would join NewsNation to host a nightly prime-time show called Dan Abrams Live, which premiered on September 27, 2021.

Reelz
On June 8th, 2022, the Wall Street Journal announced that Abrams would return as host and executive producer for On Patrol: Live, a new show on Reelz following the same format as A&E's cancelled Live PD. On Patrol: Live premiered on July, 22nd 2022.

Abrams Media

Gossip Cop

On July 29, 2009, Abrams and Michael Lewittes launched Gossip Cop, a media watchdog site that patrols the celebrity gossip universe. The site has been described by its designer, Rex Sorgatz, as "TMZ meets Smoking Gun". The site rates gossip rumors on a 0–10 scale. For the month of May 2013, the site reported over 8 million unique visitors. In 2019 Gossip Cop was acquired by Gateway Blend.

Mediaite

In September 2009, Abrams started Mediaite, a news site he described as "appreciating the celebrity of the media." The site combines editorial content with analytic rankings of media personalities. In mid-2015, it had over 7 million unique visitors per month.

Geekosystem
Geekosystem was launched on January 25, 2010. Geekosystem covered "geek" culture, following developments in science, technology, as well as internet memes and Internet culture. Abrams described the site upon launch as "a broader interest site that will celebrate and cover everything from technology and science fiction to video games and comics."

Styleite
Abrams's foray into fashion, Styleite, debuted on March 25, 2010. Functioning for fashion the way Mediaite did for journalism, Styleite launched with both news and opinion content, as well as a fashion version of the "Power Grid," which ranks designers, models, writers, and others in the style business based on influence and following. Abrams rebranded Styleite as Runway Riot in 2015, appointing model Iskra Lawrence as managing editor. RunwayRiot.com is marketed as a fashion site for "plus-sized women."

SportsGrid
Launched in May 2010, SportsGrid offers a mix of sports news, video clips and other media tracking both sports and the media world surrounding it. Like the other Abrams Media properties, the site features a Power Grid "tabulated by using a specially developed algorithm that pools a variety of metrics, including TV ratings; Web traffic and circulation counts; attendance; number of Twitter followers; on-field performance for players and coaches; and franchise values." In 2013, SportsGrid was acquired by Anthem Media Group in a stock and cash deal.

The Mary Sue

In 2011, Abrams Media started The Mary Sue, a sister site to Geekosystem with the goal of "highlighting women in the geek world, and providing a prominent place for the voices of geek women." Based on its rapid growth and high engagement, in 2014, Abrams folded Geekosystem into The Mary Sue. On November 17 2021, The Mary Sue was acquired by GAMURS Group.

The Braiser
In May 2012, Abrams launched a site focused on the personalities and lifestyles of chefs. Rather than recipes or techniques, The Braisers topics consist of chefs who "have gone from being food icons to becoming mainstream celebrities," according to an interview Abrams gave to The New York Times in late April. It was nominated for a James Beard Foundation Award in 2014. By 2015, The Braiser had gone on "a short hiatus" with plans for a relaunch, but saw no further activity as of 2019.

Law&Crime
In 2016, Abrams started LawNewz, a legal news website which also live streams trials as part of its online network. The new live trial network, slated as the new Court TV, launched on February 24, 2017, with A&E Networks taking a stake in the site. On November 13, 2017, LawNewz was rebranded to Law&Crime and is available on most OTT platforms and many cable systems in the United States.

Ambo TV
On October 15, 2018, Abrams launched his new media service, Ambo TV, a Christian TV streaming service "dedicated to broadcasting Christian sermons with an in-studio discussion." It was announced that the service would be available to the public in November 2018. The station will be located at new studios built especially for Ambo TV at Abrams Media studios in Herald Square in New York City and will feature live programming on the weekends.

Whiskey Raiders
In December 2020, Abrams launched Whiskey Raiders, a site that uses a proprietary algorithm to rate whiskeys on a scale from 50 to 100. Abrams purchased Jay West's spirit review site, t8ke.review, as part of the launch.

Writing
Abrams has published articles in The New York Times, The Wall Street Journal, USA Today magazine, The American Lawyer, and the Yale Law and Policy Review. He has also written for online magazines such as The Huffington Post, Daily Beast, and Mediaite.

In March 2010, Abrams published the book Man Down: Proof Beyond a Reasonable Doubt That Women Are Better Cops, Drivers, Gamblers, Spies, World Leaders, Beer Tasters, Hedge Fund Managers and Just About Everything Else. The book was #10 on The Washington Post best seller list of July 17, 2011, and has been translated into Russian, Indonesian, Croatian, Swedish and Hebrew, among other languages.

Abrams' second book, Lincoln's Last Trial: The Murder Case That Propelled Him to the Presidency, tells the true story of Abraham Lincoln's last murder trial. The book was released in June 2018, and spent five weeks on the New York Times Bestseller list for hardcover non-fiction. Mental Floss rated the book #1 on their list "56 Best Books of 2018."

Abrams’ third book, Theodore Roosevelt for the Defense: The Courtroom Battle to Save His Legacy, published on May 21, 2019, and became a New York Times bestseller. Theodore Roosevelt accused his former friend and ally, now turned rival, Republican Party leader William Barnes Jr. of political corruption. Barnes responded by suing Roosevelt for an enormous sum that could have financially devastated him.

Abrams' fourth book, John Adams Under Fire: The Founding Father's Fight for Justice in the Boston Massacre Murder Trial, published on March 3, 2020, and became a New York Times bestseller. The book describes how, in 1770, British soldiers shot and killed five civilians. As John Adams would later remember, "On that night the formation of American independence was born". Yet when the British soldiers faced trial, the young lawyer Adams was determined that they receive a fair one. He volunteered to represent them, keeping the peace in a powder keg of a colony, and in the process created some of the foundations of what would become United States law.

Abrams' fifth book, Kennedy's Avenger: Assassination, Conspiracy, and the Forgotten Trial of Jack Ruby was published in June 2021. It tells the story of the trial of Jack Ruby, the infamous night club owner who shot and killed Lee Harvey Oswald.

Abrams' latest book, Alabama v. King: Martin Luther King Jr. and the Criminal Trial That Launched the Civil Rights Movement  was published in May 2022. With help from Dr. King's lawyer, Fred D. Gray, and frequent collaborator David Fisher, Abrams details Dr. King's arrest and trial as he became the face of the Montgomery Bus Boycott movement. 

Abrams has made other on-air appearances covering law, politics, and to promote his books, including on all three late night talk shows. He has appeared on Jimmy Kimmel Live, The Late Show with Stephen Colbert on CBS and the Tonight Show on NBC.

Personal life
In June 2012, Abrams had his first child, a son named Everett, with girlfriend Florinka Pesenti, who was part of the winning team on The Amazing Race 3. They had a daughter, Emilia, in 2021.

Abrams was a co-owner with David Zinczenko of the restaurant The Lion in Manhattan's Greenwich Village neighborhood. The Lion closed in 2015.

Abrams's sister, Ronnie Abrams, was nominated for a federal judgeship by Barack Obama in 2011. She received her commission on March 23, 2012.

In 2021 Abrams purchased Laurel Lake Vineyards on Long Island's North Fork, which he relaunched in Summer 2021 under a name inspired by his two children, Ev&Em Vineyards.

References

External links
 
 

ABC News personalities
New York (state) lawyers
American legal writers
American television executives
American television reporters and correspondents
Jewish American writers
Columbia Law School alumni
Duke University Trinity College of Arts and Sciences alumni
Living people
MSNBC people
Anthem Sports & Entertainment
NBC News people
People from Manhattan
Jewish American journalists
1966 births
Riverdale Country School alumni